Sir Andrew Barkworth Wright KCMG CBE MC with Bar (30 November 1895 – 24 March 1971) was a British colonial administrator and army officer. He served as the Governor of British Cyprus from 1949 to 1954, and as Governor of the Gambia from 1947 to 1949.

Early life and education 
Wright was born in Mawgan-in-Meneage, Cornwall, the son of an Anglican clergyman. His heritage has been traced back to John I'Anson (1467–1546), who migrated from Belgium to Cumbria. He was educated at Haileybury and Imperial Service College from 1910 to 1914, later studying at Jesus College, Cambridge. He served as an officer in the Suffolk Regiment during World War I, and won the Military Cross (MC) in 1917.

Colonial service 
Wright joined the civil service in British Cyprus in 1922, and by 1937 had become its Colonial Secretary. He re-enlisted in the army during World War II, but left in 1943 at the rank of Lieutenant Colonel to become Colonial Secretary of Trinidad. In January 1947, he was appointed as Governor of the Gambia, and in 1948 he was knighted. During his tenure as Governor, the Colonial Development Corporation implemented the failed Yundum Egg Scheme and the marginal experimental rice farm at Wallikunda.

Wright's efforts to improve the social and economic situations were stifled by a lack of funds. However, during his time the first direct election to the Legislative Council, in 1947, was organised, which saw Edward Francis Small elected. He also adopted a policy of Africanization in the civil service. He also sought to reduce European privilege, for instance by opening up the 'European block' at the Royal Victoria Hospital. In May 1949, it was announced that Wright would be transferred to Cyprus, where there was a deteriorating political situation. Due to his popularity in the Gambia, this sparked large-scale protests in Bathurst, led by Small and J. C. Faye.

It was during his time as Governor of British Cyprus that 96% of Greek Cypriots voted for a union with Greece in 1950. Wright retired from colonial service in 1953. He died in Lewknor, Oxfordshire, on 24 March 1971.

References

1895 births
1971 deaths
Governors of British Cyprus
Governors of the Gambia
Suffolk Regiment officers